Cigaritis lilacinus, the lilac silverline,  is a species of lycaenid or blue butterfly found in Asia.

Range
The lilac silverline is found in India, Myanmar and N.Thailand.
In India, this butterfly is found from Uttarakhand and Himachal Pradesh to southern Karnataka, with also one record each from Rajasthan and Assam. The species has been located in Rawalpindi in Pakistan, and the following Indian states: Andhra Pradesh, Assam, Karnataka, Madhya Pradesh, Punjab, Rajasthan, Telangana, Uttaranchal, Uttar Pradesh, and West Bengal. The only resident, breeding population discovered is in Hesarghatta Lake in Bengaluru, Karanataka.

Description

Male

Female

Ecology and conservation 
The lilac silverline has been recorded from a wide variety of habitats that include protected wildlife reserves such as the Daying Ering Wildlife Sanctuary and Kumbhalgarh Wildlife Reserve, restored institutional campus such as the Agastya Campus in Chitoor, and open plains and gram fields in Uttar Pradesh. In all locations, except at Hessarghatta Lake, very small numbers of the species have been observed, with many observations being one individual. The lilac silverline has been sighted in relatively undisturbed reserves, but a majority of the sightings have been in areas that experience human activities such as grazing, agriculture, grazing, and regular visitations by urban photographers. Caterpillars of lilac silverline are tended by ants that offer protection from predators and parasitoids. 

The lilac silverline is protected under Schedule II of the Indian (Wildlife) Protection Act. Uncontrolled visits to its breeding habitat in Bengaluru by photographers appear to be destroying its host plant due to the traversing of a large number of vehicles indiscriminately across Hesaraghatta Lake. No other threats have been recognized for this species across its distribution range.

Gallery

References

Cigaritis
Fauna of Pakistan
Fauna of India
Butterflies described in 1884